Tom Wirtgen (born 4 March 1996 in Dippach) is a Luxembourgish cyclist, who currently rides for UCI ProTeam .

Major results

2013
 National Junior Road Championships
1st  Road race
1st  Time trial
 3rd Overall 3-Etappen-Rundfahrt
1st Stage 3
2014
 National Junior Road Championships
1st  Road race
1st  Time trial
 5th Road race, UEC European Under-23 Road Championships
 6th Time trial, UCI Junior Road World Championships
2015
 National Under-23 Road Championships
1st  Road race
1st  Time trial
2017
 1st  Time trial, National Under-23 Road Championships
 1st Young rider classification International Tour of Rhodes
 4th Time trial, UCI Under-23 Road World Championships
 8th Overall Le Triptyque des Monts et Châteaux
2018
 1st  Time trial, National Under-23 Road Championships
 1st Stage 2 Tour du Jura
 5th Overall Le Triptyque des Monts et Châteaux
2019
 2nd Time trial, National Road Championships
2020
 10th Paris–Camembert

References

External links

1996 births
Living people
Luxembourgian male cyclists
People from Dippach